Agyneta ignorata is a species of sheet weaver found in Japan. It was described by Saito in 1982.

References

ignorata
Chelicerates of Japan
Spiders of Asia
Spiders described in 1982